Lisa Lightfoot (born 3 December 1966) is an Australian middle-distance runner. She competed in the women's 800 metres at the 1996 Summer Olympics.

References

External links
 

1966 births
Living people
Athletes (track and field) at the 1996 Summer Olympics
Australian female middle-distance runners
Olympic athletes of Australia
Place of birth missing (living people)